This is a timeline documenting the events of heavy metal in the year 2012.

Bands disbanded
 A Plea for Purging
 Ajattara
 Anterior
 Averse Sefira
 Blind Witness
 The Carrier
 Cathedral
 The Crimson Armada
 Dead and Divine
 Decadence
 Defiance
 Elis
 Heavy Heavy Low Low
 Hevein
 In the Midst of Lions
 Nahemah
 Norther
 One Man Army and the Undead Quartet
 The Tony Danza Tapdance Extravaganza
 Underoath
 Unearthly Trance

Bands formed
 The Skull
Slugdge
 United Forces

Bands reformed
 Broken Hope
 Byzantine
 Coal Chamber
 Confide
 Eternal Oath
 Extol
 Malice
 The Obsessed
 Otyg
 Riot
 Sonic Syndicate

Events
 On January 4, American metalcore act Killswitch Engage have decided to continue without Howard Jones (ex-Blood Has Been Shed). On February 6, the band announced that original singer Jesse Leach has taken Jones' place.
 On January 9, it was announced that Black Sabbath guitarist Tony Iommi has been diagnosed with lymphoma. However, the band have stated that they will continue recording their new album. Within a month, the band announced that drummer Bill Ward has decided to leave the band.
 Singaporean grindcore act Wormrot were detained in Malaysia by the Selangor Islamic Religious Department. The reasoning for their arrest was "it is wrong for unmarried Muslim men and women to be in [the same] room."
 Cryptopsy announced their new bassist is Olivier Pinard (Neuraxis).
 After 16 years with the band, Anvil bassist Glenn Gyorffy (aka Glen Five) leaves the band to "broaden [his] horizons".
 Graveworm announced the return of founding member/guitarist Stefan Unterpertinger after a 10-year absence.
 Warbringer announced the departure of founding member/guitarist Adam Carroll, and his replacement as Andrew Bennett.
 After previously working with the band, Byron Stroud (Fear Factory, Strapping Young Lad) announced he is joining 3 Inches of Blood as their new permanent bassist.
 Founding member/guitarist of crossover thrash act D.R.I., Spike Cassidy, was rushed to the hospital due to complications with a colectomy.
 The Haunted founding member/vocalist Peter Dolving abruptly departs from the band via Facebook.  On October 16, founding lead guitarist Anders Björler leaves the band for the second time along with drummer Per Möller Jensen.
 Death metal band Suffocation parted ways with founding drummer Mike Smith due to musical differences.
 Christopher Amott, founding guitarist/vocalist leaves Arch Enemy because "Christopher simply isn't into playing extreme metal anymore."
 Brazilian Metal Open Air festival takes place, but is cancelled after severe logistical and financial problems.
 Michael Keene of technical death metal band The Faceless announced through Twitter that founding guitarist Steve Jones has departed from the band. This leaves Keene as the only original member left. Wes Hauch will be filling Steve's spot as the newest member.
 The Sonisphere Festival in Knebworth, UK was cancelled due to their weak economy.
 Mikael Åkerfeldt (Opeth) quits Bloodbath due to lack of interest in the death metal scene.
 Threat Signal announced the departure of drummer Alex Rüdinger due to his interest to pursue other projects.
 Slayer have announced that Jeff Hanneman will me taking more time off from the band to concentrate on his rehabilitation. Back in 2011, Jeff contracted necrotizing fasciitis (flesh-eating disease) on his right arm from a spider bite, and has been struggling in recovery since then. Gary Holt (Exodus) will continue to fill Jeff's spot until he is well enough to return. Slayer said "How long will that be? The best and most honest answer we can give you is 'as long as it takes.'"
 Dark Funeral signed a three album record deal with Century Media Records.
 Drummer Patrice Hamelin of Canadian death metal band Martyr has quit the band.  "Martyr is on hold for now."
 Marduk were banned from Minsk, Belarus.  "Pavel Radzivonaw, a departmental head at the Prosecutor General's Office, told reporters on Monday that Marduk's concert, scheduled for May 22, would not take place. 'The band preaches Satanism, which has nothing to do with art,' he says. 'This is an affront to Christian values, they preach the ideas of death, of the Third Reich.'"
 Angra vocalist Edu Falaschi announced his departure from the band.  Bassist Felipe Andreoli also announced his departure from Almah.
 Iron Maiden's 1982 album The Number of the Beast won 9.2% of the 30,000 votes cast in the UK for their favorite British album of the past 60 years.
 Sonic Syndicate's founding member/guitarist Roger Sjunnesson quits the band.
 Queensrÿche parts ways with founding member/vocalist Geoff Tate.  The band also announced Crimson Glory singer Todd La Torre hired as his replacement.
 Kamelot announced their new vocalist as Tommy Karevik (Seventh Wonder).
 Guitarist Liem N'Guyen leaves Benighted after 14 years with the band.  His replacement is said to be Adrien Guerin.
 Peter Wichers leaves Soilwork again due to "musical differences".
 Atheist announced the return of bassist Tony Choy.
 Lamb of God vocalist Randy Blythe was arrested on June 28, 2012, by Czech Police for causing a fan's death by pushing him off stage in Prague, Czech Republic. The band's publicists, have stated that Blythe is "wrongfully accused". Blythe was released on bail for 4,000,000 Czech Koruna (US$200,000), and has been held in the country because he was "considered a flight risk by the judge". Blythe posted bail, but due to the prosecutor's complaint, his bail was doubled to 8,000,000 Czech Koruna (US$400,000).  Due to his jail-time being longer than expected, Lamb of God's tour with Dethklok and Gojira was cancelled. On August 3 Randy was released from prison after 5 weeks, Lamb of God was confirmed for Knotfest.
 Frontman/guitarist Alexi Laiho of Children of Bodom was rushed to the hospital with stomach pains. He was released July 11 to continue the rest of the tour.
 The frontman/guitarist Josef "Humanoid" Vesely of death metal band !T.O.O.H.! was diagnosed with Schizophrenia.
 Blood Stain Child parts ways with female vocalist Sophia Aslanidou.  In December she is replaced by Kiki, "What makes her so unique and talented is to be able to handle both clean voice and scream voice."
 Dagoba guitarist Izakar leaves the band due to "musical differences" and to focus on his other project Blazing War Machine.
 Nuclear Blast "quit the copyright case" against 80 alleged file-sharers for sharing the All Shall Perish album "This Is Where It Ends".  The label went ahead with the charges without the band's permission.
 Ministry front-man Al Jourgensen collapsed on stage during a live performance.  The doctors said, "he was examined by numerous physicians and diagnosed to have had a full-system collapse due to extreme dehydration and heat exhaustion intensified by the lack of ventilation on stage at the venue. Doctors confirm via blood tests conducted that Jourgensen's alcohol blood levels were well below normal and no narcotics were found in his system."  The remainder of the weeks tour dates were canceled, until Al was feeling well enough to continue the "DeFiBriLlaTouR European tour".
 Baroness were caught in a terrible bus accident, where the bus fell 30 feet from a viaduct near Bath.  A Facebook page statement was released as follows, "The band members of Baroness and their crew are recovering from injuries sustained after their tour bus crashed outside of Bath England early on Wednesday morning. John Baizley has broken his left arm and left leg. Allen Blickle and Matt Maggioni each suffered fractured vertebrae. All three remain in the hospital as of this writing. Pete Adams has been treated and released from the hospital.  Three of the five crew members who were on the bus have also been treated and released. One member is still undergoing testing."
 Anthrax's song "Got The Time" was the first heavy metal song played on the planet Mars. The song "was one of several songs on NASA's wake-up playlist for the Mars Rover, Curiosity, that touched down on the Red Planet August 5th."
 Decapitated drummer Kerim "Krimh" Lechner quits the band due to "personal differences".
 Eluveitie lead guitarist Simeon Koch leaves the band after 8 years.  Rafael Salzmann will be his replacement for live performances.
 Hydra Head Records has indefinitely closed its doors.
 Nightwish lead singer Anette Olzon parts ways with the band after 5 years. Floor Jansen (ex-After Forever) will replace her for the remainder of the band's Imaginaerum World Tour.
 Gwar announces their newest lead guitarist Pustulus Maximus on October 1.
 Metallica announces the launch of their own record label "Blackened Recordings", and have taken ownership of all their previous mastered tracks.
 Megadeth end their contract with Roadrunner Records after 5 years and 3 albums.
 On November 9, 2012, Amberian Dawn announced on their official site, that they are parting ways with singer Heidi Parviainen, along with drummer Heikki Saari and guitarist Kasperi Heikkinen. The replacement members are new vocalist Päivi "Capri" Virkkunen, and ex-members Joonas Pykälä-aho (drums) and Emil "Emppu" Pohjalainen (guitar). Parviainen explained via Facebook, "Early this year we noticed that we had reached the point where we didn't have much to offer to each other any more, and my own ambitions and Amberian Dawn's goals weren't coinciding any longer."

Deaths
 January 3 – Joey Lombard (a.k.a. Fingers), former bassist of Incantation, died from committing suicide at the age of 42.
 January 5 – Nicole Bogner, former vocalist of Visions of Atlantis,  died from an undisclosed disease at the age of 27.
 January 14 – Robbie France, former drummer of Diamond Head, UFO and Wishbone Ash, died from ruptured aorta at the age of 52.
 January 25 – Mark Reale, guitarist and founding member of Riot, died from complications with Crohn's disease at the age of 57.
 February 14 – Tonmi Lillman (a.k.a. Otus), former drummer of To/Die/For, Sinergy, Ajattara, drummer of Lordi, died from undisclosed reasons at the age of 38.
 February 15 – Hans Jørgen Andersen , former guitarist of Mercenary, died from undisclosed reasons at the age of 36.
 March 3 – Ronnie Montrose, guitarist and leader of Montrose and Gamma, died from a self-inflicted gunshot wound at the age of 64.
 April 5 – Jim Marshall "Lord of Loud" the founder of Marshall Amplification died at the age of 88.
 April 10 – Richie Teeter, drummer of the Dictators and former drummer of Twisted Sister, died from esophageal cancer at the age of 61.
 April 21 – Rob Cranny (a.k.a. Balfabar Nosugref the Almighty), owner of Canadian Northern Storm Records and vocalist of Detsörgsekälf, died from a heart attack at the age of 27.
 May 4 – Rob Doherty, former guitarist and vocalist of Into Eternity, died from undisclosed reasons at the age of 41.
 May 13 – Trondr Nefas, guitarist and singer of Urgehal, died from natural causes on his sleep at the age of 34.
 May 20 – Steeve Hurdle, former guitarist of Gorguts, died of post-surgical complications at the age of 41.
 May 31 – Michael Grant, singer of Crescent Shield, Onward, Legend Maker and Cypher Seer, died of unidentified illness at the age of 39.
 June 29 – Teddy Mueller, former drummer of AXE, died from undisclosed reasons at the age of 57.
 July 16 – Jon Lord, composer, pianist and Hammond organ player of Deep Purple and Whitesnake, died from a cancer at the age of 71.
 November 1 – Mitch Lucker, singer of Suicide Silence, died from a motorcycle accident at the age of 28.
 December 8 – Huw Lloyd-Langton, guitarist of Hawkwind and the Meads of Asphodel, died from a cancer at the age of 61.
 December 23 – Mike Scaccia, guitarist of Rigor Mortis and Ministry died after collapsing on stage during Rigor Mortis' performance for vocalist Bruce Corbitt's 50th birthday at the age of 47.

Albums released

January

February

March

April

May

June

July

August

September

October

November

December

References

External links
 About.com: Heavy Metal
 Blabbermouth.net
 www.FactorMetal.com
 Metalstorm.net
 Metalunderground.com
 Ultimate-Guitar.com
 TheGauntlet.com

2010s in heavy metal music
Metal